The 1932 Saint Mary's Gaels football team was an American football team that represented Saint Mary's College of California during the 1932 college football season.  In their 12th season under head coach Slip Madigan, the Gaels compiled a 6–2–1 record and outscored all opponents by a combined total of 118 to 59.  The Gaels' victories included a 14–7 besting of UCLA and a 7–0 victory over Oregon. The lone setbacks were a 12-12 tie with California and losses to Fordham (0–14) and Alabama (0–6).

Fullback Angelo Brovelli was selected by the Associated Press as a first-team player on the 1932 All-Pacific Coast football team. Guard Steponovitch received first-team honor from the United Press.

Schedule

References

Saint Mary's
Saint Mary's Gaels football seasons
Saint Mary's Gaels football